Corn Island International Airport  is a civil-military public International Airport that serves Great Corn Island on the South Caribbean Coast Autonomous Region of Nicaragua and located in the Island's Downtown area known locally as Brig Bay, The airport is managed by the state-run Administrative Company of International Airports, more commonly known as the EAAI given its Spanish name, the Empresa Administradora de Aeropuertos Internacionales.

The Bluefields NDB (ident: CIS) is located at the airport.

The runway at the airport is 6,234 ft long, and it is located at an elevation of 18 feet.

Expansion 
An expansion programme was underway by 2011 and by 2013 it was completed with the Expansion of the runway from 4,750 feet to 6,234 feet and then the old runway was refurbished. Lights were going to be added to the runway but as of 2023 there still has been no further information about it.

The Terminal was also Refurbished as Modernized with new infraestructure upgrades, x-ray machines, two immigration offices, two cafeterias, new parking lot.

The runway was extended so that medium sized jet aircraft can land there such as Embraer E, Gulfstream G and Bombardier Challenger

Airlines and destinations

See also

 List of airports in Nicaragua
 Transport in Nicaragua

References

External links
 OpenStreetMap - Corn Island

Airports in Nicaragua
South Caribbean Coast Autonomous Region